Benn Skerries are a small group of rocks which extend up to  westward from Norvegia Point on the island of Bouvetøya. They were charted and named in December 1927 by a Norwegian expedition in the Norvegia under Captain Harald Horntvedt.

References 

Subantarctic islands
Landforms of Bouvet Island